The Oval (also known as the Kennington Oval and, due to sponsorship reasons, the Kia Oval) is a cricket ground in London, England, it was established in 1845 and has a capacity of 23,500. International cricket has been played at the ground since 1880, when England played Australia in the first Test match staged in England. One Day Internationals (ODIs) have also been played at the ground, the first of these was in 1973 between England and the West Indies. 175 Test centuries have been scored at the Oval along with 38 ODI centuries.

The Englishman W. G. Grace scored the first Test century at the ground, Grace made 152 against Australia in 1880. In 1938 Len Hutton, another Englishman, broke the record for the highest individual Test innings. Hutton, with his score of 364, surpassed Wally Hammond's previous record of 336 not out. Hutton's innings was the only Test triple century scored at the Oval until Hashim Amla's treble in July 2012, and is still the highest by an Englishman at any ground. Herbert Sutcliffe is the only man to have scored five Test centuries at the ground, while Hammond, Hutton, David Gower and Kevin Pietersen have all scored four centuries. The most centuries scored by an overseas player at the ground is three, which was achieved by the South African Bruce Mitchell.,

The first ODI century scored at the Oval was in 1973 by the West Indian Roy Fredericks, who made 105 against England. West Indian Evin Lewis's innings of 176, scored against England in 2017, is the highest seen at the ground. Two players have scored three ODI centuries at the ground – England's Marcus Trescothick and India's Shikhar Dhawan – however no other batsman has scored more than one.

Key
 * denotes that the batsman was not out.
 Inns. denotes the number of the innings in the match.
 Balls denotes the number of balls faced in an innings.
 NR denotes that the number of balls was not recorded.
 Parentheses next to the player's score denotes his century number at the Oval.
 The column title Date refers to the date the match started.
 The column title Result refers to whether the player's team won lost or if the match was drawn.

List of centuries

Test centuries
The following table summarises the Test centuries scored at the Oval.

One Day International centuries
The following table summarises the One Day International centuries scored at the Oval.

References 

 

The Oval
Oval
Cricket in London
Centuries
Centuries